is a baseball action video game from Grasshopper Manufacture and Suda51 for the Xbox 360 Kinect. It was announced at Microsoft's 2011 TGS conference and was initially scheduled for release at the end of 2011, but slipped to early April 2012.

Reception

Diabolical Pitch received mixed reviews from critics upon release. On Metacritic, the game holds a score of 56/100 based on 24 reviews.

Notes

References

2012 video games
Action video games
Baseball video games
Grasshopper Manufacture games
Kinect games
Microsoft games
Multiplayer and single-player video games
Unreal Engine games
Video games developed in Japan
Xbox 360 games
Xbox 360 Live Arcade games
Xbox 360-only games